AHG may refer to:

 Additional CPF Housing Grant, a housing subsidy in Singapore
 American Heritage Girls, a youth organisation in US.
 Anchor Hanover Group, a UK Housing Association
 Automotive Holdings Group, an Australian company
 Qimant language, a language spoken in part of Ethiopia